Parity price may refer to:

 Export parity price
 Import parity price

See also
 Doctrine of parity